Schmidgaden is a municipality in the district of Schwandorf in Bavaria, Germany.

Geography 
Schmidgaden lies in the north of the Upper Palatinate.
The municipality includes the following areas: Schmidgaden, Trisching, Wolfsbach, Rottendorf, Gösselsdorf, Littenhof

History 

The first documentary reference goes back to the year 1123. Schmidgaden belonged to the bursary Amberg as well as to the district court of the Bavarian electorate. Due to the administrative reform in the Bavarian Kingdom, with the municipality edict the political municipality Schmidgaden arose. In 1972 the municipalities of Rottendorf, Trisching as well as parts of Gösselsdorf were incorporated.

Religions 
While the majority of Schmidgaden is Catholic, Lutheran and a few other minorities can be found.

References

External links 
 Official website (German) 

Schwandorf (district)